The Main Eastern Highway is the lifeline of the high range townships of the Travancore region of Kerala state, India. It is also known as Punalur-Muvattupuzha Highway. Main Eastern Highway is categorized as State Highway - 08 ( SH-08 ) of Kerala. It is the second longest State Highway of Kerala covering a distance of 153.6 km. The districts it passes through are Kollam, Pathanamthitta, Kottayam, Idukki and Ernakulam.

It interconnects the townships of Punalur, Alimukku, Piravanthoor, Pathanapuram, Koodal, Konni, Pathanamthitta, Ranni, Manimala, Ponkunnam, Pala, Thodupuzha to the main intersection at Muvattupuzha merging to MC Road which extends northwards till Angamaly at NH 66.

Route description 
Punalur - Nellippally- Mukkadavu- Vettithitta- Pandakasala - Alimukku- Poovannummoodu- Piravanthoor - Vazhathoppu- Kadakkamon- Pallimikku Junction -Pathanapuram - Kallumkadavu Junction (joins SH 05) - Kalanjoor - Koodal - Konni - Kumbazha (Pathanamthitta, meets T.K.Road / SH - 07) - Mylapra - Mannarakulanji - Uthimmoodu - Mandiram - Ranni - Makkapuzha - Ponthanpuzha - Karikkattoor - Manimala - Cheruvally - Ponkunnam - Elamgulam -Paika- Pala - Thodupuzha - Vazhakulam - Nirmala College junction - Muvattupuzha(joins MC Road -SH 01)
The economy of the High-Ranges of South and Central Kerala largely depends on the Main Eastern Highway. The main trunk road to Sabarimala, Kerala's Largest Pilgrim Centre starts from Main Eastern Highway near Pathanamthitta.  Though it is the shortest route to Angamaly and Northern Kerala townships from Punalur, (The Second Largest City of Kollam District) and in turn from the Tamil Nadu townships Tenkasi, Tirunelveli and Thoothukudi. It is not developed to its capacity.  It acts as a parallel road to the Main Central Road.  (M.C.Road/SH-01). It is also the Shortest route to the Kerala State Capital Thiruvananthapuram from Kumali and other major townships of Idukki district Like Munnar, Kattappana, Thodupuzha, Moolamattam, Nedumkandam etc.

Townships on the Main Eastern Highway 
The townships Punalur, Alimukku, Piravanthoor, Pathanapuram, Koodal, Konni, Kumbazha, Ranni, Manimala, Ponkunnam, Pala, Thodupuzha, Muvattupuzha comes under the Main eastern highway road

Future

KSTP Project 
The upgrading work of Punalur -Ponkunnam-Thodupuzha stretch is currently under progress as part of the World Bank funded Kerala State Transport Project (KSTP).

References

See also 
 M. C. Road
 Roads in Kerala
 List of State Highways in Kerala

State Highways in Kerala
Roads in Idukki district